Achaea chrysopera is a species of moth of the family Erebidae first described by Herbert Druce in 1912. It is found in Tanzania.

References

Endemic fauna of Tanzania
Achaea (moth)
Insects of Tanzania
Moths of Africa
Moths described in 1912